Bomb Girls is a Canadian television drama that debuted on January 4, 2012, on Global and Univision Canada in Spanish. The plot profiles the stories of four women working in a Canadian munitions factory during World War II, beginning in 1941. Originally intended to be a six-part drama mini-series, two seasons have aired. The show began airing in the United States on ReelzChannel on September 11, 2012 and in the United Kingdom on ITV3 on November 10, 2012, in Ireland on TG4 on 6 January 2013 and in Poland on Fokus TV on 10 June 2014.

Characters

Main
Lorna Corbett (Meg Tilly) – The Victory Munitions' Blue Shift floor matron. Lorna's relationship with her husband is strained. Her daughter works as a nurse's aide and her two sons are fighting in the war. Lorna tries to keep reins on the girls who work under her and often advocates for their best interests, being very moral and traditional. She has an affair with Marco after originally trying to get him fired, with the affair resulting in a pregnancy. Lorna later miscarries after her husband finds out about the affair.
Gladys Witham (Jodi Balfour) – The only daughter of a wealthy Rosedale family, she originally began working in the office during Blue Shift but had her position changed so she could work on the floor. She has a one-night affair (petting and kissing only) with a soldier, Lewis, and accepts his marriage proposal out of guilt, despite already being engaged; she later discovers that her fiancé has been having an affair. She speaks her mind and works hard to be accepted by the other floor workers. Eventually, her fiancé enlists and is killed overseas. Gladys struggles with her future and not knowing her role.
Betty McRae (Ali Liebert) – A tomboyish and skilled worker of German ancestry from the prairies, who thrives at the factory; their best worker, she is also in charge of training the Blue Shift's new girls. Because of this, she becomes the spokes-model for the factory in a war campaign film. Her hard, tough exterior masks her insecurity and feelings of being an outsider, due to her hidden lesbianism. Betty slowly becomes best friends with Kate, with whom she falls in love. After being rejected romantically by Kate, Betty becomes romantically involved with a soldier named Teresa. She goes to jail for Kate after taking the blame for the accidental death of Kate's father, though eventually is released and returns to working at the factory.
Kate Andrews (Charlotte Hegele) – Born Marion Rowley, she is one of the factory's newest floor workers. Kate is on the run from her abusive, street-preacher father. Viewed as sheltered, naïve, and very shy, Kate slowly begins to break out of her perceived "shell". A talented singer, she befriends Leon Riley, who introduces her to jazz and gets her a job singing for his band. In the season one finale, she returns home with her father, who has managed to track her down. She returns to work at Victory Munitions in the second season, where she begins dating Betty's ex-boyfriend, Ivan, and eventually becomes engaged to him (though they later break up). After a factory explosion kills Ivan, Kate decides to quit the factory and follow her dreams to be a singer.

Supporting
Vera Burr (Anastasia Phillips) – A worker on the Blue Shift, disfigured in an accident at the factory. Vera develops a close relationship with Archie while they're both in the hospital. At the end of season one, she sleeps with Harold Akins to secure the position of an office girl. It's implied that she had an abortion. She and Carol develop a rivalry in the office. During the second season, she and Marco have slowly been growing closer as well. Vera eventually starts picking up soldiers for casual encounters, as she enjoys the attention they give her and the gifts with which they shower her. Soon she becomes engaged with Marco but later dies.
Marco Moretti (Antonio Cupo) – Italian-born factory worker who originally clashes heavily with Lorna. He is often discriminated against due to his family's heritage. He lives at home with his mother, his father being sent away to an internment camp. He falls in love with Lorna and has an affair with her with results in a pregnancy. Lorna leads him to believe that her husband is the baby's father. Marco struggles with how his Italian heritage colors him in the eyes of others because of the war.
Ivan Buchinsky (Michael Seater) - An engineer at Victory Munitions who works during the Blue Shift, he is unable to serve in the military because of asthma. He bonds with Betty and becomes her "boyfriend". Betty later dumps him and he begins to date, Kate. The two eventually become engaged. But then Ivan calls off the wedding finding out about Kate, despite still being in love with each other. Ivan then dies without ever telling Kate that they he still wanted to marry her, even though he was with another girl, Helen, who was a Nazi spy.
James Dunn (Sebastian Pigott) – A wealthy American citizen and Gladys' fiancé. He has an affair with Hazel which results in an STD. He is recruited into the army after the bombing of Pearl Harbor and is later killed by German bombing in England in June 1942.
Bob Corbett (Peter Outerbridge) – Lorna's husband. Bob is a veteran of the first World War and was left crippled. He struggles to connect emotionally with his family. He develops a close friendship with Edith. Later he finds out about his wife's affair and pregnancy. He decides to remain at her side after she miscarries.
Eugene "Gene" Corbett (Brett Dier) – Son of Lorna and Bob. Ace gunner promoted to sergeant. Had several close brushes with death in the war. He's an arrogant ladies man who develops an attraction for Gladys and suffers from PTSD.
Harold Akins (Richard Fitzpatrick) Plant supervisor; the boss at Victory Munitions.
Edith McCallum (Lisa Norton) – A widowed floor worker at Victory Munitions who is close friends with Lorna. She has a young son and daughter at home. She befriends Bob while dealing with the aftermath of her husband's death and unknowingly informs him of Lorna's pregnancy.
Hazel MacDougall (Brittany Allen) – A factory girl on Red Shift (formerly Blue) who dislikes and causes trouble for Gladys. She has an affair with Gladys's fiancé, James, and gives him gonorrhea.
Carol Demers (Carlyn Burchell) – Gladys' best friend. She works during the Blue Shift as an office girl. She keeps Gladys' secret about working on the floor until her father finds out with a surprise visit. She is somewhat of a snob and often looks down on the other factory girls as a lower class and enjoys her position in the office away from danger.
Archie Arnott (Billy MacLellan) – A factory worker who becomes disabled after an explosive testing accident. He befriends Vera while at the hospital and later commits suicide with her help while suffering a painful death from sepsis.
Leon Riley (Jim Codrington) – An African-Canadian man who works in the warehouse at Victory Munitions. A jazz musician and singer, he saves Kate from an attempted assault. The two slowly become friends, with Leon offering Kate advice and encouraging her musical abilities.
Rollie Witham (James McGowan) – Gladys' father and the wealthy owner of a large chain of grocery stores.
Adele Witham (Kate Hennig) – Gladys' mother. A socialite who masks her pain with alcohol, she convinces Lorna to help get Gladys fired in an attempt to control her daughter. She has yet to recover from her son's death and is prone to bouts of depression in which she disappears from her wifely duties as hostess.
Sheila Corbett (Natasha Greenblatt) - Bob and Lorna's daughter, who works as a nurse's aide at the local hospital and is training to be a nurse. She eventually develops feelings for her colleague Dr. Patel.
Narendra "Ned" Patel (Gabe Grey) - A doctor at the local hospital who treats Lorna when she is admitted, and later starts dating her daughter, Sheila.

Episodes

Series overview

Season 1 (2012)

Season 2 (2013) 
On February 7, 2012, Bomb Girls was renewed by Shaw Media for a second season consisting of 12 episodes. The second season premiered on Global Canada January 2, 2013.

Production
The series was created by Michael MacLennan and Adrienne Mitchell and based on a concept by Debi Drennan and Maureen Jennings. Although set at the fictional Victory Munitions plant in Toronto, the series was based on the real accounts of workers from the DIL Ajax and the GECO Scarborough plants.

The first season was written by Michael MacLennan, Esta Spalding, John Krizanc, and Shelley Eriksen and directed by Adrienne Mitchell, Ken Girotti, and Anne Wheeler. The executive producers are Janis Lundman, Michael MacLennan, Adrienne Mitchell, and Michael Prupas. The first season producer is Wendy Grean. The editors are Teresa De Luca and Tad Seaborn. Éric Cayla does cinematography on the show. Aidan Leroux is the production designer, Joanne Hansen is the costume designer, Valentine Prokop is in the sound department, and Marie Nardella is in makeup department. Mario Rachiele adds visual effects to the program. The score is composed by Peter Chapman, and music supervision is by Andrea Higgins of Arpix Media.

The series was filmed in Toronto with a converted furniture factory in Etobicoke standing for the Victory Munitions Factory. Season 1 was filmed from September 12 to November 16, 2011. Muse Entertainment and Back Alley Film Productions are the production companies. In Canada, the series is distributed by Shaw Media; internationally the series is distributed by Muse Distribution International.

In April 2013, Global TV and Shaw Media announced that Bomb Girls would not return for a third season. They did, however, suggest that a two-hour TV movie serving as a series finale was in the works and was planned air in 2014. Disappointed viewers launched an internet campaign in an effort to get this decision reversed.

Bomb Girls: Facing the Enemy
In October 2013, Shaw Media announced that production had begun on a two-hour television film. The original cast, including Meg Tilly, Jodi Balfour, Charlotte Hegele, Ali Liebert, Antonio Cupo, Anastasia Phillips, Michael Seater, and Peter Outerbridge reprised their roles. The film was shot in Toronto and Hamilton until November 20, 2013. This was confirmed by Ali Liebert. The film, titled Bomb Girls: Facing the Enemy, premiered on Global TV in Canada on March 27, 2014 and was later aired on Reelz in the United States on May 26, 2014.

See also

 Canadian Industries Limited#World War II, munitions industry in WWII
 List of awards and nominations received by Bomb Girls 
 List of programs broadcast by Global

References

External links
 on Global Television Network
Production website

Bomb Girls at The TV IV

English-language television shows
2012 Canadian television series debuts
2013 Canadian television series endings
2010s Canadian television miniseries
Canadian aviation films
Lesbian-related television shows
World War II television drama series
Television series set in the 1940s
Television shows filmed in Toronto
Television series by Corus Entertainment
Television series by Muse Entertainment
Global Television Network original programming
2010s Canadian LGBT-related drama television series
Canadian women in World War II